Michelle Jaggard-Lai (born 6 May 1969) is a retired tennis player from Australia. She turned professional in 1984. In her career, Jaggard-Lai won three doubles titles on the WTA Tour. She also reached the quarterfinals of the 1992 Australian Open, partnering Kimiko Date. In singles, she reached round three of the 1989 Australian Open. She reached a career-high doubles ranking of No. 42 in February 1991 and a best singles ranking of No. 83 in May 1993.

Jaggard-Lai was a member of the Australia Fed Cup team that lost in the final of the 1993 Federation Cup.

She played in the singles main draw at the Australian Open eight times, the French Open six times, Wimbledon four times & the US Open once. In doubles, she played in the main draw at the Australian Open seven times, the French Open & Wimbledon nine times, and the US Open six times.

She married ex-professional soccer player Gershwin Lai from the Netherlands, in February or March 1992.

Jaggard-Lai retired from the tour at the end of 1994 (aged just 25 & ranked No. 2 in Australia in singles at the time). Together with her husband, she is a tennis teacher at Wakehurst Tennis in Seaforth, New South Wales, Australia.

WTA career finals

Doubles: 5 (3 titles, 2 runner-ups)

ITF Circuit finals

Singles (2–6)

Doubles (7–1)

References

External links
 
 
 

1969 births
Living people
Australian female tennis players
Australian Open (tennis) junior champions
Sportswomen from New South Wales
Tennis players from Sydney
Wimbledon junior champions
Grand Slam (tennis) champions in girls' singles
Grand Slam (tennis) champions in girls' doubles
20th-century Australian women